Democratic National Party (in Spanish: Partido Nacional Democrático) was a political party in Peru.  It was founded in 1915 by José de la Riva Agüero. In contrast to its founders later flirtations with fascism the PND was a moderate party near the centre of Peruvian politics.

References

Defunct political parties in Peru
Political parties established in 1915
Political parties with year of disestablishment missing